The Lakewood Local School District, also known as Lakewood Local Schools, is a public school district serving Hebron in Licking County, Ohio.

Schools
Lakewood High School
Lakewood Middle School
Jackson Intermediate School
Hebron Elementary
Lakewood Digital Academy

References

External links
 

School districts in Ohio
Education in Licking County, Ohio